Zafra vexillum is a species of sea snail in the family Columbellidae, the dove snails.

References

vexillum
Gastropods described in 2008